The Nordic combined events have been contested at the Universiade since 1960, though were not included in 1975 and 1981. Since Erzurum 2011, the sport has become an optional sport in the Universiade.Starting at the 2023 edition women's and mixed events are also on the program.

Events

Medalists

Individual Gundersen

Sprint

Mass start

Relays

Medal table 
Last updated after the 2023 Winter Universiade

References 
Sports123

 
Universiade
Sports at the Winter Universiade
Nordic skiing at the Winter Universiade